A maidam is a tumulus of the royalty and aristocracy of the medieval Ahom Kingdom (1228–1826) in Assam. The royal  are found exclusively at Charaideo; whereas other  are found scattered in the region between Jorhat and Dibrugarh towns. Structurally, a maidam consists of vaults with one or more chambers. The vaults have a domical superstructure that is covered by a hemispherical earthen mound that rises high above the ground with an open pavilion at the peak called chow chali. An octagonal dwarf wall encloses the entire maidam.

Burial is the predominant funeral rite of the Tai people, to which the Ahom people originally belonged.  This is opposed to the Hindu system of cremation.  After the Ahom kings adopted Hinduism, they chose to bury the ashes after cremation.

Maidams 
Inside the Maidams there are underground vaults or chambers for different purposes, one for keeping the body of departed king with all the necessary things  for afterlife, and others for the servents, care-takers, horses and elephants. The present height of Maidams is reduced due to various natural calamities. In earlier times at least 10 living persons were buried alive with the departed king to take care of him in afterlife, however this custom was abolished by Rudra Singha.

Height of the Maidams depended on the power of the kings, most of the Maidams were not designated by the name of kings, so most remain unidentified, except the Maidams of Gadadhar Singha and Rudra Singha. Most of the big Maidams belongs from the late 17th century and 18th century, earlier most of the Maidam chambers were built using solid wood poles and beams, it got replaced with bricks and stones since Gadadhar Singha and his succesors. As a custom only the people of Gharphaliya  and Lakhurakhan clans were permitted to bury the dead bodies of Kings and queens. There was a specified officer called Chang-Rung Phukan responsible for construction of Maidams. Chang-Rung Phukan was also the Chief-architect of Ahom kingdom. Officers called Maidam Phukans and guards called Maidamiya were appointed to protect and maintain the Maidams.

Since the time of Rajeswar Singha, the Ahom kings took to cremation and performed their funeral ceremonies according to Vedic rites.

The structural construction and the process of royal burials are explained in historical documents called Chang-Rung Phukanor Buranji, which detail even the articles that were buried. Later excavations under the Archaeological Survey of India found some of the  previously defiled, with the articles mentioned in the Buranji missing.

Excavation 

Being famous for its vault treasure Maidams also attracted many plunderes from Mughals, British to even local people, who have plundered the maidams multiple times. The earlier stekch of Maidams was made by 1848 by Serjeant C.Clayton who superintendent an excavation of Maidam in the 1840s now, identified as the maidam of Prime Minister Purnanada Burhagohain. Clayton and his team found rings, silver toothpick case, ear ornaments, goblets, gold lime container etc. In 1905, one Maidam was excavated under the surveillance of many Ahom princes, but nothing is known thereafter.

In 2000-02, Archaeological Survey of India, Guwahati circle excavated Maidam No. 2. It retained the characteristics of an full fledged Maidam. The Maidam vault and covering earthen mound was made out of burned bricks, encircled by an octagonal boundary wall. There was an hole at the roof of the Maidam indicated it was robbed earlier. The arched shape door of the maidam was found on the western side after it was excavated, which was originally covered with bricks and stone masonry. Though already robbed it still yielded several artifacts including skeleton remains of 5 individuals,  ivory  decorative pieces , several pieces of wooden objects (including a Xorai designed at the shape of a pillar), ivory panel depicting royal Ahom insignia,  carvings of elephants, peacock and floral motifs etc. The exact dating of this Maidam couldn't be done, but it is estimated at first half of 18th century.

Gallery

Notes

References

External links

 Moidams in Dibrugarh District, Assam
 Lachit Moidam The Moidam of Lachit Borphukan.
 Multi-crore rupee project to give facelift to Ahom maidams The Telegraph, August 4, 2006.

Monuments and memorials in India
Ahom kingdom
Tumuli
Tai history
Assam
Pyramids by country
Tombs in India
Tourism in India
History of India
World Heritage Tentative List for India